Quinault ( or ) is an unincorporated community in Grays Harbor County, Washington, United States. Quinault is located on the Olympic Peninsula.

Lake Quinault is the location of Lake Quinault Lodge, which is listed on the National Register of Historic Places.

Climate
Quinault is on the windward side of the Olympic mountains, which gives it an oceanic climate (Köppen climate classification Cfb) with a very wet 3485 mm of precipitation falling each year. It is one of the wettest places in Washington state. Summers average about 17ºC and winters 3 degrees. Both are relatively mild. Summer has a significant drying trend as is common in the Pacific northwest, but significant rain still falls. In the winter months there is some snow but not too much.

References

Unincorporated communities in Grays Harbor County, Washington
Unincorporated communities in Washington (state)